The National Institute for Lifelong Education (NILE) is a national level organization, which was established based on article 19 of the Lifelong Education Act of the Republic of Korea.

History

See also
Lifelong education
Bachelor's Degree Examination for Self-Education

References

External links
NILE homepage

Korean culture